Sannarpsgymnasiet is a Swedish high school based in Halmstad, Sweden. It offers a broad selection of courses, ranging from special school to International Baccalaureate.

References

Gymnasiums (school) in Sweden
International Baccalaureate schools in Sweden
Halmstad
Buildings and structures in Halland County

Sannarpsgymnasiets skoltidning heter Brännbart och har funnits sedan 2004. Tidningen ges ut i tre nummer per år, samt har sedan 2013 även en internetsida, www.skoltidning.sannarp.nu.

Redaktionen har på Sannarpsgymnasiet sitt tillhåll i 008, där det är troligast att stöta på en redaktionsmedlem.

2014 tillträdde Anton Johansson som chefredaktör för Brännbart och tidningen gjorde under hans ledning stora framsteg. Anton Johansson utsågs 2015 till den evige chefredaktören, Brännbarts egen Kim II Sung. 2016 blåste dock nya vindar över Brännbartredaktionen då Johanna Rasmusson, Brännbartveteran, axlade rollen som chefredaktör, samtidigt som hon myntade den nya kampanjen "Inget varar för evigt".

Tidningen är nu (diskutabelt) Sveriges mest lästa skoltidning. Föregångarna till dagens skoltidning hette Stajl och Snaps.[1]